Qaleh-ye Azimabad (also Romanized as Qal‘eh-ye ‘Az̧īmābād; also known as ‘Az̧īmābād and Azīmābād) is a village in Azimiyeh Rural District, in the Central District of Ray County, Tehran Province, Iran. At the 2006 census, its population was 4,073, in 987 families.

References 

Populated places in Ray County, Iran